Hobgood may refer to:

 Hobgood (surname)
 Hobgood, California, former name of Niland, California
 Hobgood, North Carolina, town in Halifax County